Archimandrite Zareh Baronian (October 2, 1941 in Bucharest, Romania – April 13, 2017) was an Armenian-Romanian theologian and abbot.

References

1941 births
2017 deaths
Writers from Bucharest
Armenian abbots
Romanian abbots
Armenian Apostolic Christians
Romanian Oriental Orthodox Christians
Romanian people of Armenian descent
Romanian theologians
Archimandrites